Giacomo Luigi Ciamician (27 August 1857 – 2 January 1922) was an Italian chemist and senator. He was a pioneer in photochemistry and green chemistry.

Education and career 
Ciamician was born in Trieste, Italy (then part of the Austrian Empire) to Armenian parents. His family had moved from Istabul to Trieste in 1850.

Ciamician studied at University of Vienna and University of Giessen, where he received his PhD under Hugo Weidel in 1880. He then worked as an assistant for Stanislao Cannizzaro at the University of Rome, before moving to University of Padua as a lecturer in 1887. He became a professor at University of Bologna and spent the rest of his career there.

In 1910 he became the first man born in Trieste to be nominated Senator, in the XXIII Legislation of the Kingdom of Italy.

Research 
Ciamician was an early researcher in the area of photochemistry, where from 1900 to 1914 he published 40 notes, and nine memoirs. He received his Ph.D. from the University of Giessen. His first photochemistry experiment was published in 1886 and was titled "On the conversion of quinone into quinol.

In 1912 he presented a paper before the 8th International Congress on Applied Chemistry later also published in Science in which he described the world's need for an energy transition to renewable energy. Ciamician saw the possibility to use photochemical devices that utilize solar energy to produce fuels to power the human civilization and called for their development. They would not only make humanity independent from coal, but could also rebalance the economic gap between rich and poor countries. His vision makes him one early proponents of artificial photosynthesis.:

"''On the arid lands there will spring up industrial colonies without smoke and without smokestacks; forests of glass tubes will extend over the plains and glass buildings will rise everywhere; inside of these will take place the photochemical processes that hitherto have been the guarded secret of the plants, but that will have been mastered by human industry which will know how to make them bear even more abundant fruit than nature, for nature is not in a hurry and mankind is.  And if in a distant future the supply of coal becomes completely exhausted, civilization will not be checked by that, for life and civilization will continue as long as the sun shines!'"'

Honors and awards 
Ciamician received the honorary Doctor of Laws (DLL) from the University of Glasgow in June 1901. University of Bologna's Department of Chemistry is named after Ciamician.

Selected publications

See also
 Ciamician-Dennstedt rearrangement

External links
 Giacomo Luigi Ciamician at Michigan State University

References

1857 births
1922 deaths
Scientists from Trieste
University of Vienna alumni
Academic staff of the University of Bologna
Italian chemists
Members of the Senate of the Kingdom of Italy
Italian Austro-Hungarians
Italian people of Armenian descent
Austrian people of Armenian descent
Members of the Göttingen Academy of Sciences and Humanities
University of Giessen alumni
Academic staff of the University of Padua